Nyole may refer to: 
Nyole tribe, of the Luhya nation 
Nyole language (Kenya) (ISO 639-3: nyd)
Nyole language (Uganda) (ISO 639-3: nuj)
Nyole people, an ethnic group of Uganda